The 2021–22 Alabama A&M Bulldogs basketball team represented Alabama A&M University in the 2021–22 NCAA Division I men's basketball season. The Bulldogs, led by fourth-year head coach Dylan Howard, played their home games at the Elmore Gymnasium in Normal, Alabama as members of the Southwestern Athletic Conference.

This was the Bulldogs' final season at the Elmore Gymnasium, with the new Alabama A&M Events Center set to open for the 2022–23 season.

This was also Howard's final season as head coach at Alabama A&M, as the school parted ways with him on March 22, 2022. Otis Hughley Jr. was named as his replacement on April 18.

Previous season
The Bulldogs finished the 2020–21 season 6–9, 4–9 in SWAC play to finish in seventh place. However, they were ineligible for postseason play due to APR violations.

Roster

Schedule and results

|-
!colspan=12 style=| Non-conference regular season

|-
!colspan=9 style=| SWAC regular season

|-
!colspan=9 style=| SWAC tournament

Sources

References

Alabama A&M Bulldogs basketball seasons
Alabama AandM Bulldogs
Alabama AandM Bulldogs basketball
Alabama AandM Bulldogs basketball